The 12263 / 12264 Hazrat Nizamuddin–Pune Duronto Express is a Superfast Express train of Indian Railways Duronto Express type connecting  (NZM) to  (PUNE). It is currently being operated with train numbers 12263 / 12264.

Coach composition

The rake has 10 AC 3 tier coaches, 3 AC 2 tier coaches, 1 AC First Class, 1 Pantry car and 2 EOG cars making a total of 17 coaches.
The train is similar to Pune–Ahmedabad Duronto. Earlier train was of 16 coaches with ICF Rajdani rakes. It had speed of 130 kmph.

Background

This train had its inaugural run on 28 September 2009. It currently runs with new LHB Rajdhani rakes, which were allotted to it recently. It travels at a peak speed of 130 km/h with an average speed of 76 km/h as 12263 and 75 km/h as 12264.

Service

It is the fastest train on the Delhi–Pune sector. It averages 76.96 km/hr as 12263 Duronto Express covering 1520 km in 19 hrs 45 mins & in 20 hrs 45 mins averaging 73.25 km/hr as 12264 Duronto Express.

Some of the other trains that cover the Delhi–Pune sectors are 12629/30 Karnataka Sampark Kranti Express, 11077/78 Jhelum Express, 12779/80 Goa Express, 12781/82 Swarna Jayanti Express.

Route

 in both directions.

Traction
At its introduction, it was hauled by a WCAM-2/2P or WCAM-3 locomotives of the Kalyan Shed from Pune to  after which a Tughlakabad or Vadodara-based WAP-7 or Ghaziabad-based WAP-5 used to haul the train for the remainder of its journey. This was due to DC traction on the Central Line in Mumbai region. Now it is hauled end to end by Vadodara or Tuglakabad WAP 7, as an offlink Ajni WAP 7 hauls it.

With a complete changeover from DC to AC in 2014, it is currently hauled end to end by a Tughlakabad-based WAP-7 locomotive.

See also
Goa Express
Jhelum Express

References

External links

Transport in Delhi
Transport in Pune
Rail transport in Maharashtra
Rail transport in Madhya Pradesh
Rail transport in Gujarat
Rail transport in Rajasthan
Rail transport in Delhi
Duronto Express trains
Railway services introduced in 2009